The following list projects the total number of people around the globe that are eligible for military service. The estimates are drawn from demographic projections in the CIA World Factbook as of 2009. As defined by the U.S. Central Intelligence Agency, "fit for military service" means all citizens of a country (both male and female) between the ages of 16 and 49 that are not otherwise disqualified for health reasons.

See also
Military service
Enlistment age by country
Demography

Notes

External links
CIA The World Factbook - Manpower fit for military service

Military lists
Demographic lists